John W. Kintzinger (August 12, 1870 – April 3, 1946) was a justice of the Iowa Supreme Court from January 1, 1933, to December 31, 1938, appointed from Dubuque County, Iowa.

References

External links

Justices of the Iowa Supreme Court
1870 births
1946 deaths